Little Woodbury is the name of an Iron Age archaeological site in Britford parish, near Salisbury in the English county of Wiltshire.

It was partially excavated between 1938 and 1939 by Gerhard Bersu, a German archaeologist who had been driven to Britain following discrimination by the Nazis. In excavations like Little Woodbury he introduced the revolutionary approaches in the excavation of settlements (e.g. the identification of timber post remains) developed in continental Europe during previous decades.

A settlement had been identified at the site through aerial archaeology by O.G.S. Crawford almost twenty years previously. He had seen a circular enclosure as a cropmark, and it was identified for further excavation as a possible source of information on prehistoric Britain.  Bersu was commissioned by the Prehistoric Society to excavate the site in order to improve knowledge of early British settlement sites, which were until then poorly understood.

Bersu dug a network of parallel trenches, one after the other, across the site. By this method he was able to identify a large roundhouse and several other domestic features. The postholes of the roundhouse enabled Bersu to argue that these structures were the common domestic building type of the Iron Age; prior to his work it was thought that people lived in holes in the ground. Through Bersu's identification of animal bone and cereal grains, he convinced other archaeologists to re-evaluate the large holes they had found as storage pits.

When war broke out in 1939, work stopped and Bersu was interned on the Isle of Man. He never returned to the site and post-excavation work was never fully completed. The results from Little Woodbury however served to influence generations of archaeologists to take an interest in the day-to-day life of ancient peoples and the roundhouse has become a regular feature in interpreting prehistoric sites.

External links 

History of Wiltshire
Hill forts in Wiltshire